Revelation 22 is the twenty-second (and the last) chapter of the Book of Revelation or the Apocalypse of John, and the final chapter of the New Testament and of the Christian Bible. The book is traditionally attributed to John the Apostle. This chapter contains the accounts of the throne of God in the New Jerusalem, the conversation between John and the Angel and the epilogue of the book.

Text
The original text was written in Koine Greek. This chapter is divided into 21 verses.

Textual witnesses
Some early manuscripts containing the text of this chapter are among others:
Codex Sinaiticus (330-360)
Codex Alexandrinus (400-440)

References to Jesus

Verse 13
I am the Alpha and the Omega, the Beginning and the End, the First and the Last.
Cross reference: Revelation 21:6
"The Beginning and the End, the First and the Last" (KJV; NKJV): NU and M read "First and the Last, the Beginning and the End".

Verse 14
Blessed are those who wash their robes. They will be permitted to enter through the gates of the city and eat the fruit from the tree of life.

Verse 15
Outside the city are the dogs—the sorcerers, the sexually immoral, the murderers, the idol worshipers, and all who love to live a lie.

Verse 16 
"I, Jesus, have sent My angel to testify to you these things in the churches.I am the Root and the Offspring of David, the Bright and Morning Star."''

See also
 John's vision of the Son of Man
 New Jerusalem Dead Sea Scroll

Notes

References

Bibliography

External links
 King James Bible - Wikisource
English Translation with Parallel Latin Vulgate 
Online Bible at GospelHall.org (ESV, KJV, Darby, American Standard Version, Bible in Basic English)
Multiple bible versions at Bible Gateway (NKJV, NIV, NRSV etc.)

22
Lucifer